Branislav Nušić ( – 19 January 1938) was a Serbian playwright, satirist, essayist, novelist and founder of modern rhetoric in Serbia. He also worked as a journalist and a civil servant.

Life
His father, George Nousias (Thessaloniki, 1822 – Pristina, 1916), was a Serbianized Aromanian merchant with family roots in the village of Magarevo in the Ottoman Macedonia, while his mother, Ljubica (1839 – Belgrade, 1904), was a Serb homemaker from Brčko, Bosnia, then under Austro-Hungarian rule. 

Young Alkibijad completed his primary education in Smederevo, a port town along the Danube, before returning to Belgrade to complete his secondary education. In 1882, at the age of 18, he legally changed his name to Branislav Nušić. He subsequently enrolled in the Belgrade Higher School (later the University of Belgrade), graduating with a law degree in 1885. That year, at the age of 21, he was conscripted into the Royal Serbian Army. Nušić's service coincided with the two-week-long Serbo-Bulgarian War of November 1885, which he witnessed first-hand as a Serbian corporal in western Bulgaria.

Nušić was quick to criticize the conduct of the Serbian Supreme Command during the war, which ended in a Bulgarian victory. He outlined his objections in the book Pripovetke jednog kaplara iz srpsko–bugarskog rata 1885 (The Stories of a Corporal from the Serbo–Bulgarian War of 1885), which was published in 1886. He went on to spend one year's study at the University of Graz in Austria-Hungary. Nušić was subsequently arrested, convicted of lèse-majesté and sentenced to two year's imprisonment. He served his sentence at a prison in Požarevac but was released after only one year due to good behaviour.

In 1889, shortly after his release from prison, Nušić entered the civil service as an official in Serbia's Ministry of Foreign Affairs. Several years later, in 1893, he married Darinka Đorđević, the 17-year-old niece of the Serbian consul in Bitola, Dimitrije Bodi. The couple had three children, one of whom died in infancy. Between 1889 and 1900, Nušić worked as a clerk at the Serbian consulates to the Ottoman Empire in Bitola, Serres, Thessaloniki, Skopje, and Pristina. Despite his earlier anti-war rhetoric, Nušić became an enthusiastic supporter of using military means to force the Ottoman Empire out from the Balkans. In 1900, he received a post at the Ministry of Education. Shortly thereafter, he became the head dramaturgist of the National Theatre in Belgrade. In 1904, he was appointed head of the Serbian National Theatre in Novi Sad. In 1905, he left his new post and moved to Belgrade to work as a journalist. He also worked as an editor for various magazines and feuilletonist for Politika, writing under the pseudonym Ben Akiba.

Following Austria-Hungary's annexation of Bosnia and Herzegovina in October 1908, Nušić led a series of anti-Habsburg demonstrations in Belgrade. He climbed a balcony at the National Theatre, railed against the "plunder" of Serbian lands by Austria-Hungary, and demanded immediate military action. He subsequently rode his horse into the Ministry of Foreign Affairs, to the consternation of Prime Minister Nikola Pašić. The popularity of Nušić's works, as well as those of fellow dramatist Petar Kočić, increased dramatically following the annexation. In 1912, Nušić returned to Bitola as a civil servant. Macedonia was captured and annexed by Serbia following the First Balkan War, and in February 1913, Nušić was appointed prefect of Bitola. He was quickly forced to resign after consistently failing to adhere to the demands of the Black Hand and the ultra-nationalist guerilla bands that formed the backbone of the Royal Serbian Army's occupation force. Despite this, he remained in Skopje, and helped establish the city's first theatre in 1913. The outbreak of World War I brought further personal tragedies Nušić's way; his son Strahinja was killed on the frontline while serving in the Serbian Army. Nušić lived in Skopje until November 1915, when Austria-Hungary, Germany and Bulgaria successfully invaded and occupied Serbia. He took part in the Serbian army's retreat through Albania between November 1915 and February 1916. He lived in Italy, Switzerland and France until the end of the war.

Nušić returned to Serbia a broken man, devastated by the loss of his only son. He was appointed to be the first head of the Ministry of Education's art department, serving alongside the writers Borisav Stanković and Stanislav Vinaver. He also became the first post-war director of the theatre in Skopje. He remained at this post until 1923. Afterwards, he was appointed head of the Sarajevo National Theatre. In Sarajevo, Nušić wrote Ramazanske noći (Nights of Ramadan) under the pseudonym Halil Delibašić. He returned to Belgrade in 1927. In Vienna, he acted in the film Paramount Review in 1930. Nušić became a member of the Serbian Royal Academy in 1933. Following The Bereaved Family'''s 1935 premiere in Sofia, he received a medal from the Bulgarian state. He was also awarded Order of Saint Sava, Order of the White Eagle and Order of Prince Danilo I. Nušić died in Belgrade on 19 January 1938.

Social criticism

Nušić is more celebrated as a playwright than as a novelist. His incidental novels and journalistic feuilletons are not always moralistic or polished, but they are lively and amusing sketches of life. He is more prolific in historical drama and comedy. Of his plays, the most popular are comedies The Cabinet Minister's Wife (Госпођа министарка), A Suspicious Person (Сумњиво лице), A Member of the Parliament (Народни посланик), Bereaved Family (Ожалошћена породица), The Deceased (Покојник), and Doctor (Др).

Through his plays, Nušić presented Serbian society and the mentality of the middle class in small towns and counties. He brought to the stage not only the retailers, canton captains, semi-educated officers, and current and former ministers' wives, but also formerly distinguished and overly ambitious householders, their decadent sons, failed students, distinguished daughters of marriageable age, and greedy upstarts.

All-in-all he depicted the Serbian middle class and its morality, which managed to survive despite all the political and social reforms, newly formed educational system and cultural institutions. He also paid special attention to the social conditions of their origins, as they started out with unrealizable desires and insatiable appetites, the distorted family and marital relationships, misunderstandings and intolerance between fathers and sons, unfaithful husbands and wives, officers’ ignorance and corruption and unreal political ambitions. Nušić thus became not only a playwright, observer and interpreter of his time, but also an analyst of Serbian society and its mentality at a specific historical period.

Selected works
Some of Nušić's major works (with English translation of titles):

ComediesНародни посланик (A Member of the Parliament) (1885)Сумњиво лице (A Suspicious Person) (1887)Протекција (Favoritism) (1889)Обичан човек (An Ordinary Man ) (1899)Свет (The Publicity) (1906)Пут око света (Travel Around the World) (1910)Госпођа министарка (The Cabinet Minister's Wife) (1929)Мистер Долар (Mister Dollar) (1932)Ујеж (SYEW - Society of Yugoslav Emancipated Women) (1933)Ожалошћена породица (Bereaved Family) (1934)Др (PhD) (1936)Покојник (The Deceased) (1937)Власт (unfinished) (Authority)Ђоле кермит (unfinished)

DramasТако је морало бити (It Had to Be This Way) (1902)Јесења киша (Autumn Rain)Иза Божјих леђа (Behind God's Back)Пучина (Offing) (1902)Кирија (Rental Fee)

NovelsОпштинско дете (County's Child), published in Sarajevo as Опћинско дијете (1902)Хајдуци (Hajduks) (1933)Деветстопетнаеста (915th)Аутобиографија (Autobiography) (1924)

Short storiesПолитички противник (Political Rival)Посмртно слово (Eulogy)Класа (Class)Приповетке једног каплара (The Corporal's Stories) (1886)

TragediesКнез Иво од Семберије (Prince Ivo of Semberia)Хаџи-Лоја Наход (Foundling)

OtherРамазанске вечери (Ramadan Nights) (1898)Реторика (a discourse on rhetoric) (1934)

In popular culture A Member of the Parliament, a film based on the comedie from 1885 of Branislav Nusic and directed by Stole Janković, was produced in 1964 by the Bosna Film.A Member of the Parliament (remake), a television film based on the comedie of Branislav Nusic and directed by Slavenko Saletović, was produced in 1990 by the broadcasting service RTB. TV FilmA Suspicious Person, a film based on the comedie from 1887 of Branislav Nusic and directed by Soja Jovanović, was produced in 1954 by the Avala Film.A Suspicious Person (remake), a television film based on the comedie of Branislav Nusic and directed by Arsa Milosevic, was produced in 1989 by the broadcasting service RTB. TV FilmThe Cabinet Minister's Wife, a film based on the comedie from 1929 of Branislav Nusic and directed by Žorž Skrigin, was produced in 1958 by the UFUS. FilmThe Cabinet Minister's Wife (remake), a television film based on the comedie of Branislav Nusic and directed by Zdravko Šotra, was produced in 1989 by the broadcasting service RTB.Bereaved Family, a television film based on the comedie from 1935 was produced in 1960 by the broadcasting service RTB.Bereaved Family (remake), a television film based on the comedie of Branislav Nusic and directed by Milan Karadzic, was produced in 1990 by the broadcasting service RTB. TV FilmTravel Around the World, a film based on the comedie from 1910 of Branislav Nusic and directed by Soja Jovanović, was produced in 1964 by the Avala Film.
In 2011 TV film  Albatross'', Branislav Nušić was portrayed by actor Milan Vranešević.
 Nušićijada, annual comedy festival inaugurated in 1968, bears the name of Branislav Nušić

References

References

Further reading

External links
 The Legacy of Branislav Nušić
 
 Extracts from his autobiography
 
 The Deceased
 The Cabinet Minister's Wife


1864 births
1938 deaths
Writers from Belgrade
Writers from Smederevo
20th-century Serbian people
Serbian novelists
Serbian dramatists and playwrights
University of Belgrade Faculty of Law alumni
People of the Serbo-Bulgarian War
Serbian people of Aromanian descent
Burials at Belgrade New Cemetery
Serbian prisoners and detainees
Theatre people from Belgrade